Dactylorhiza majalis subsp. baltica is a subspecies of Dactylorhiza majalis. Sometimes, this plant is considered as a species: Dactylorhiza baltica.

This plant was described by (Klinge) H.Sund.

This plant is native to Eastern Europe.

References

External links

majalis subsp. baltica
Flora of Europe